Denis Aleksandrovich Zabrodin (born 25 January 1984) is a former Russian professional football player.

Club career
He played in the Russian Football National League for FC Metallurg-Kuzbass Novokuznetsk in 2007.

External links
 

1984 births
Living people
Russian footballers
Association football midfielders
FC Sokol Saratov players
FC Novokuznetsk players
FC Vityaz Podolsk players
FC Nosta Novotroitsk players